Harihar Soren is an Indian politician and belonged to Indian National Congress. He was elected to the Lok Sabha, lower house of the Parliament of India from Keonjhar in Odisha.

References

External links
 Official Biographical Sketch in Lok Sabha Website

1929 births
Lok Sabha members from Odisha
India MPs 1980–1984
India MPs 1984–1989
Living people